The Hulcross Formation is a geologic formation in the Western Canada Sedimentary Basin in northeastern British Columbia that was deposited in marine environments during the late Albian stage of the Early Cretaceous period. At one time considered to be a member of the Commotion Formation, it was elevated to formation status by D.F. Stott in 1982. It preserves ammonites and other fossils.

Lithology
The Hulcross Formation consists of dark grey to black shales and mudstones that were deposited in marine environments. The sediments coarsen upward and thin beds of siltstone and platy sandstone are present in the uppermost part. Sideritic ironstone concretions are common.

Thickness and Distribution
It is exposed along the Peace River eastward from the foothills almost as far as its confluence with the Halfway River.

Relationship to Other Units
The Hulcross Formation is part of the Fort St. John Group. Originally described as a member of the Commotion Formation, the Hulcross was elevated to formational status along with the other members of the Commotion by D.F. Stott in 1982, who proposed that the term 'Commotion Formation' be abandoned.

The shales of the Hulcross abruptly overlie the sandstones of the Gates Formation and grade into the overlying sandstones of the Boulder Creek Formation.  It is equivalent to the Harmon Member of the Peace River Formation in the Peace River plains to the east, and to the Wildhorn Member of the Scatter Formation in the Liard River region.

See also

 List of fossiliferous stratigraphic units in British Columbia

References

Cretaceous British Columbia
Geology of the Rocky Mountains